John B. Frizzell (born in Kingston, Ontario) is a Canadian screenwriter and film producer.

After several years writing, directing and co-producing the documentary series A Different Understanding for TVOntario, Frizzell joined partners Niv Fichman, Barbara Willis Sweete and Larry Weinstein to found the Canadian production company Rhombus Media. He left Rhombus in the mid-eighties to pursue a career in writing.

His credits include the television series Airwaves, The Rez, Twitch City, Angela Anaconda and Material World and the films A Winter Tan, Getting Married in Buffalo Jump, Life with Billy, Dance Me Outside, On My Own and Lapse of Memory. He was co-winner of a Writers Guild of Canada Award for Lucky Girl.

Filmography

External links

References 

Canadian male screenwriters
Film producers from Ontario
Writers from Kingston, Ontario
Living people
Year of birth missing (living people)